Events from the year 1601 in France

Incumbents
 Monarch – Henry IV

Events
17 January – Treaty of Lyon: France gains Bresse, Bugey and Gex from Savoy, ceding Saluzzo in exchange

Births
27 May – Antoine Daniel, Jesuit missionary to French North America (died 1648)
17 July – Emmanuel Maignan, physicist and theologian (died 1676)
22 August – Georges de Scudéry, novelist, dramatist and poet (died 1667)
27 September – Louis XIII of France (died 1643)
7 October – Florimond de Beaune, mathematician (died 1652)

Full date missing
 Jacques Gaffarel, librarian and astrologer (died 1681)
 Catherine Lepère, midwife (died 1679)

Deaths
 
29 January – Louise of Lorraine, queen consort (born 1553)
11 June – Françoise d'Orléans-Longueville, princess (born 1549)
24 June – Henriette of Cleves, noblewoman (born 1542)
17 November – Florimond de Raemond, jurist and historian (born 1540)

Full date missing
Germaine Cousin, saint (born 1579)
Hugues Sambin, sculptor and woodworker (born c.1520)

See also

References

1600s in France